Worth Square, or General Worth Square, is a public square in Manhattan located at East 25th Street between Broadway and Fifth Avenue directly west of Madison Square Park. The location was designated as a public park in 1847, and since 1857 the square has served as both a memorial to and the burial site of William Jenkins Worth. The only other monument that doubles as a mausoleum is Grants Tomb in Harlem. The 0.27 acre square is one of the many Triangle/Plazas administered by the New York City Department of Parks and Recreation.

History

Worth's monument, which was erected in 1857, was one of the first to be erected in a city park since the statue of George III was removed from Bowling Green in 1776. The city's second-oldest monument, it is the only one in the city except for Grant's Tomb that doubles as a mausoleum.

The capital project expands on a 2008 initiative where part of the intersection of Broadway and Fifth Avenue was repurposed into a public plaza, simplifying that intersection. As part of the 2017 project, Worth Square was expanded, converting the adjoining block of Broadway into a "shared street."

See also
 List of city squares

References

External links 

 NYC Department of Parks and Recreation: "GENERAL WORTH SQUARE"

Flatiron District
Squares in Manhattan